HNZ may refer to:
 Croat People's Union
 Heinz, an American food processing company
 Henderson–Oxford Airport, in North Carolina, United States
 Herzegovina-Neretva Canton
 HNZ Group, a Canadian helicopter operator
 Helicopters (NZ), their New Zealand subsidiary